Sainte-Rose was a settlement in New Brunswick. Originally surveyed as the Ste. Rose Settlement for land grants, it eventually differentiated into the communities of Sainte-Rose-Gloucester and Haut-Sainte-Rose; from 1988 it formed the core of a local service district named Sainte-Rose. It was annexed by the Regional Municipality of Tracadie in 2014.

Notable people

See also
List of communities in New Brunswick

References

Designated places in New Brunswick
Former municipalities in New Brunswick
Neighbourhoods in Grand Tracadie-Sheila